Anmugar Amadal N Zafran (Berber) is an annual saffron festival hosted in Taliouine, Morocco every winter. The village is famous for its saffron production, with Morocco being one of the main exporters of the spice worldwide.

Festivals in Morocco